Heckeldora is a genus of flowering plants belonging to the family Meliaceae. They are shrubs or small trees with odd-pinnate leaves. Plants are dioecious, with male and female flowers on separate plants.

Its native range is western and western central Tropical Africa. It is found in the countries of Cameroon, Congo, Equatorial Guinea, Gabon, Gulf of Guinea Is., Ivory Coast, Liberia, Nigeria, Sierra Leone and Zaire.

The genus name of Heckeldora is in honour of Édouard Marie Heckel (1843–1916), a French botanist and medical doctor, and director of the Jardin botanique E.M. Heckel in Marseille. It was first described and published in Bull. Mens. Soc. Linn. Paris Vol.2 on page 1268 in 1896.

Known species
According to Kew:

Heckeldora jongkindii 
Heckeldora ledermannii 
Heckeldora leonensis 
Heckeldora leptotricha 
Heckeldora staudtii 
Heckeldora trifoliolata 
Heckeldora zenkeri

References

Meliaceae
Meliaceae genera
Dioecious plants
Flora of West Tropical Africa
Flora of Cameroon